Zahira may refer to:

 Zahira El Ghabi, Moroccan FIDE master (2005)
 Zahira Zahir, American barber and cosmetologist
 Zahira Kazim, the main character of the 2016 film A Wedding (Noces)

See also
 Zahira College (disambiguation)

Zahira is a name that can be given to a female. It shows a woman of exemplary character, such as the characteristics of honesty, integrity, generosity, kindness, loyalty, and many others.